Ulrick Brad Eneme Ella (born 22 May 2001) is a professional footballer who plays as forward for Ligue 1 club Angers. Born in France, he represents the Gabon national team.

Club career
Eneme Ella began playing football at the youth academies of Sens and Auxerre in France, before moving to Austria with Red Bull Salzburg in 2017. He had a stint on loan with Liefering before moving to Amiens in the summer of 2019. He began his senior career with Amiens' reserves, before transferring to England to join the academy of Brighton & Hove Albion on 22 September 2020.

In June 2022, Eneme Ella signed a three-year contract with Angers.

International career
Born in France, Eneme Ella is of Gabonese descent. He is a former youth international for France, having represented the France U16s, U17, U18, and U19. However, he decided to represent Gabon and debuted with them  in a 2–1 2022 FIFA World Cup qualification loss to Egypt on 16 November 2021.

References

External links
 
 

2001 births
Living people
People with acquired Gabonese citizenship
Sportspeople from Sens
French sportspeople of Gabonese descent
Gabonese footballers
Gabon international footballers
French footballers
Footballers from Bourgogne-Franche-Comté
Association football forwards
France youth international footballers
Championnat National 3 players
FC Sens players
AJ Auxerre players
FC Red Bull Salzburg players
FC Liefering players
Amiens SC players
Brighton & Hove Albion F.C. players
Angers SCO players
2021 Africa Cup of Nations players
Gabonese expatriate footballers
French expatriate footballers
Gabonese expatriate sportspeople in England
French expatriate sportspeople in England
Expatriate footballers in England
Gabonese expatriate sportspeople in Austria
French expatriate sportspeople in Austria
Expatriate footballers in Austria
Black French sportspeople